The 2018–19 California Baptist Lancers women's basketball team will represent California Baptist University during the 2018–19 NCAA Division I women's basketball season. They were led by head coach Jarrod Olson who is in his sixth season at California Baptist. The Lancers will play their home games at the CBU Events Center in Riverside, California as members of the Western Athletic Conference.

This season will be CBU's first of a four-year transition period from Division II to Division I. As a result, the Lancers are not eligible for NCAA postseason play and will not participate in the WAC tournament. They received an automatic bid to the WNIT where they defeated by Pepperdine in the first round.

Roster

Schedule

|-
!colspan=9 style=}| Regular season

|-
!colspan=9 style=| WNIT

See also
2018–19 California Baptist Lancers men's basketball team

References

California Baptist Lancers women's basketball seasons
California Baptist
California Baptist Lancers women's basketball
California Baptist Lancers women's basketball
California Baptist